Hans G. Hornung is an emeritus C. L. "Kelly" Johnson Professor of Aeronautics and Director of the Guggenheim Aeronautical Laboratory of the California Institute of Technology (GALCIT). He received his bachelor (1960) and master (1962) degrees from the University of Melbourne and his Ph.D. degree (1965) in Aeronautics from Imperial College, London. He worked in the Aeronautical Research Laboratories, Melbourne (1962–63, and 1965–1967), and in the Physics Department of the Australian National University (1967–1980), with a sabbatical year as a Humboldt Fellow in Darmstadt, Germany, 1974. In 1980 he accepted an offer to head the Institute for Experimental Fluid Mechanics of the DLR in Göttingen, Germany. He left Germany in 1987 to serve as the director of GALCIT. During his time at GALCIT he oversaw the construction of three large facilities: the T5 hypervelocity shock tunnel, the John Lucas Adaptive-Wall Wind Tunnel, and a supersonic Ludwieg tube.

He has made contributions in gas dynamics, notably Mach reflection and effects of dissociation, in separated flows, and in wind tunnel technology. He was elected as a foreign member to the Royal Swedish Academy of Engineering Sciences in 1991. In 1997, Hornung was elected a member of the National Academy of Engineering for contributions to hypersonics and aerodynamics.

Books

Hans G. Hornung, Dimensional Analysis: Examples of the Use of Symmetry, Dover Publications (2006)

Honors 

1988 ICAS von Karman Award, International Cooperation in Aeronautics
1991 Foreign Member Royal Swedish Academy of Engineering Science
1991 Scientific Member of the Board of the DLR
1997 Foreign Associate National Academy of Engineering
1999 Ludwig-Prandtl-Ring, German Aerospace Society
2011 AIAA Fluid Dynamics Award
Fellow, AIAA, Royal Aeronautical Society, AAAS, Australasian Fluid Mechanics Society
2012 Honorary doctorate, ETH Zurich
2015 AIAA Hypersonic Systems and Technologies Award

References

External links
 Caltech GALCIT page
 Partial List of Publications
 Caltech Hypersonics Group

Living people
21st-century American engineers
Fluid dynamicists
Fellows of the Royal Aeronautical Society
Fellows of the American Academy of Arts and Sciences
Fellows of the American Institute of Aeronautics and Astronautics
Ludwig-Prandtl-Ring recipients
Foreign associates of the National Academy of Engineering
Academic staff of Technische Universität Darmstadt
1934 births